Aarodum Parayaruthu is a 1985 Indian Malayalam film, directed by A. J. Rojas. The film stars Rohini, Shankar, Siddique and Sukumaran in the lead roles. The film has musical score by P. C. Susi.

Cast

Rohini
Shankar
Bhagyalakshmi (actress)
Sukumaran
Unnimary
Vijayan
Babitha Justin
Balan K. Nair
Siddique
 Kothuku Nanappan
Kuthiravattam Pappu
Lalithasree
Sreenath

Soundtrack
The music was composed by P. C. Susi and the lyrics were written by Poovachal Khader and Malloor Ramakrishnan Nair.

References

External links
 

1985 films
1980s Malayalam-language films